The Pacific Between is a romantic coming of age novel by Raymond K. Wong. Published in 2006, The Pacific Between was the finalist for the IPPY Book Award in 2006. The novel is loosely based on the author's experience as an immigrant and young adult, but the characters and events are entirely fictional.

The Pacific Between contains many themes such as betrayal, sacrifice, unconditional love, pride, prejudice, and life's lessons, set in Southern California and Hong Kong. It is Raymond K. Wong's debut novel.

Plot overview
When Greg Lockland returns to California for his parents' funeral, he discovers letters that suggest an affair between his ex-lover, Lian, and his late father. Suspicions, anger and jealousy take Greg on a transpacific journey to find the truth. One by one, people from the past return to his life, including elusive and perfect Lian. Uncovering deep-rooted deceptions creates more twists and turns to the past than an old Chinese alleyway. The Pacific Between evinces the power of unconditional love and deals with personal subjects such as death, estrangement, and betrayal. It is a man's journey to discover himself and the world around him. Told with wit and humor, this nostalgic tale speaks true to the heart about relationships, families, and sacrifices. Raymond K. Wong's rich Asian voice makes his story spring to life through the development of his vibrant characters, exotic settings, complex Chinese-American relationships, humor, and a superb plot of perceived betrayal.

Explanation of the novel's title
The Pacific Ocean physically separates East and West, America and China; it also separates the protagonist from his past. He later travels across the Pacific to find his truths. Figuratively, there is a vast ocean within the protagonist's heart and soul.

Plot summary
When entrepreneur Greg Lockland arrives in California to attend his parents' funeral, his world begins to unravel. Pictures of a brother he barely remembers and letters discovered hidden in his father's safe deposit box suggest an illicit affair between his late father and Greg's ex-lover Lian Wan.

Confused and angry, Greg visits Kate Walken, a young woman with whom his relationship has taken an unexpected, romantic turn. Greg hates secrets and the hurt they cause. Yet, he tells Kate only of the pictures he found. Greg battles with his mixed emotions and can't bring himself to tell her about Lian. Does he still love Lian? Does he love Kate? Can he love Kate?

Greg is like a boy who never grew up. He'll stop at nothing to get what he wants. Though he can be affectionate, he can be obnoxious, deceiving and secretive-all the things he loathes.

Seething anger, growing suspicion, and inescapable jealousy accompany Greg on a transpacific journey to Hong Kong in search of Lian and the truth about the affair.

Greg has no idea he's about to unlock a secret that has been kept closeted for years. One after another, people return from his past, each adding another roadblock to Greg's mysterious puzzle. With each piece of information, Greg is forced to re-examine his beliefs, feelings, and relationships with old friends and family.

Among those who help Greg is Agnes, the Director of Nursing at the hospital where his father once worked. She is a bossy, mannish, British nurse whom Greg never liked. During his relentless search to uncover the truth, Greg is surprised to find Agnes with his happy-go-lucky friend Old Chow and realizes Agnes has a passionate side. Agnes and Old Chow prod Greg to explore his feelings and their secret plans push him into another situation of doubt.

(Summarized by Joanne D. Kiggins)

Characters
Greg Lockland - An American entrepreneur who grew up in Hong Kong but lives in the U.S. as an adult. He is spoiled and he always gets what he wants, except that he really doesn't know what he wants in life. He falls in love with a childhood friend, Kate, but he still holds on to his first love, Lian. When he discovers secrets about Lian, he embarks on a transpacific journey to find the truth.
Kate Walken - A young American woman living in San Diego. She used to know Greg Lockland when she was still in high school. After years of separation, she reunites with Greg and falls in love with him. However, she has no idea how Greg feels about her.
Lian Wan - A Chinese nurse living in Hong Kong. She was once Greg Lockland's lover when they were both very young. After Greg returned to the States, he never heard from Lian again.
Agnes Cunningham - A British nurse living in Hong Kong. Greg's old adversary.
Old Chow - A Chinese custodian. Greg's old friend.
Howard Cape - An American doctor working in Hong Kong. Lian's old boyfriend and Greg's friend.
Victor Marcello - An American opera singer in Hong Kong. He helps Greg look for Lian.
Martin Cowen - Greg's old chump from high school. Their lives drift apart after Greg returned to the States. They both vied for Lian's affection.
Helen - Martin Cowen's deaf daughter. A headstrong girl whom Greg suspects is his father's illegitimate daughter.
Patrick Taylor - Greg's best friend in the States.
Susan - Patrick's daughter.
Ollie - a bartender in Hong Kong.
David Kwan and Ming Sing Chow - Greg's old chumps from high school and mutual friends with Martin Cowen.

Awards
2006 Independent Publishers Book Award - Multicultural Adult Fiction

Release details
2006, USA, Behler Publications , Pub date February 15, 2006, Trade Paperback

See also

Raymond K. Wong

External links
Review at BlogCritics
Review at January Magazine

2006 American novels
Chinese-American novels
Novels set in Hong Kong
Novels set in California
American bildungsromans
2006 debut novels